Manpreet is an Indian given name.

List of people with the given name 
 Manpreet Akhtar, Punjabi folk singer
 Manpreet Bambra, Indian actress
 Manpreet Brar, Indian actress and model
 Manpreet Gony, Indian cricketer
 Manpreet Juneja, Indian cricketer
 Manpreet Kaur, Indian shot putter
 Manpreet Singh Ayali, Indian politician
 Manpreet Singh Badal, Indian politician
 Manpreet Singh, Indian boxer
 Manpreet Singh, Indian field hockey player
 Manpreet Singh, Italian cricketer
 Manpreet Singh, Singaporean cricketer

Fictional characters 

 Manpreet Sharma, character from the British soap opera Emmerdale

Hindu given names
Indian given names